Valle de Zaragoza  is a settlement in the Mexican state of Chihuahua.
It serves as the municipal seat of the surrounding municipality of Valle de Zaragoza. Ranchera singer Francisco Avitia was born in Valle de Zaragoza.

As of 2010, the town of Valle de Zaragoza had a population of 2,223, up from 1,871 as of 2005.

History
Valle de Zaragoza was founded on 10 December 1780, as Nuestra Señora del Pilar de Conchos; it later became known as Pilar de Conchos.
Its current name, given to it on 28 April 1864,  honours General Ignacio Zaragoza and his defeat of the French in the Battle of Puebla of 5 May 1862.

References

Populated places in Chihuahua (state)
Populated places established in 1780